The Kormilovka is a river in Perm Krai, Russia, a left tributary of the Kungur, which in turn is a tributary of the Iren.

References 

Rivers of Perm Krai